Skylab Three may refer to:

 Skylab 3 (SL-3), third Skylab mission
 Skylab 4 (SLM-3), third manned Skylab mission
 Skylab C, the Earth-bound  ground-based full-sized trainer for Skylab
 Skylab III, a 2002 album by Rogério Skylab

See also
Skylab One (disambiguation)
Skylab Two (disambiguation)
Skylab Four (disambiguation)
Skylab (disambiguation)